The Elyria Athletics were an American football team based in Elyria, Ohio. They played in the Ohio League until 1919, and then became an independent team. The team won the 1912 Ohio League championship, with an upset win  over Peggy Parratt's Akron Indians.

However, the team declined to join the American Professional Football Association, later known as the National Football League, in 1920. Still the Athletics did continue to play APFA teams, including a Thanksgiving game against the Columbus Panhandles. The team folded after the 1920 season.

Notes

References 
 

Ohio League teams
Defunct American football teams in Ohio
Elyria, Ohio